Manter is a city in Stanton County, Kansas, United States.  As of the 2020 census, the population of the city was 132.

History
The first post office in Manter was established in 1923.

Geography
Manter is located at  (37.524205, -101.884462).

Demographics

2010 census
As of the census of 2010, there were 171 people, 73 households, and 47 families residing in the city. The racial makeup of the city was 91.8% White, 2.3% Native American, 4.1% from other races, and 1.8% from two or more races. Hispanic or Latino of any race were 19.9% of the population.

There were 73 households, of which 30.1% had children under the age of 18 living with them, 50.7% were married couples living together, 9.6% had a female householder with no husband present, 4.1% had a male householder with no wife present, and 35.6% were non-families. 31.5% of all households were made up of individuals, and 10.9% had someone living alone who was 65 years of age or older. The average household size was 2.34 and the average family size was 3.00.

The median age in the city was 39.8 years. 28.7% of residents were under the age of 18; 2.8% were between the ages of 18 and 24; 22.8% were from 25 to 44; 26.3% were from 45 to 64; and 19.3% were 65 years of age or older. The gender makeup of the city was 48.0% male and 52.0% female.

2000 census
As of the census of 2000, there were 178 people, 67 households, and 46 families residing in the city. The racial makeup of the city was 90.45% White, 6.74% Native American, 2.25% from other races, and 0.56% from two or more races. Hispanic or Latino of any race were 3.93% of the population.

There were 67 households, out of which 34.3% had children under the age of 18 living with them, 62.7% were married couples living together, 4.5% had a female householder with no husband present, and 29.9% were non-families. 26.9% of all households were made up of individuals, and 10.4% had someone living alone who was 65 years of age or older. The average household size was 2.66 and the average family size was 3.21.

In the city, the population was spread out, with 31.5% under the age of 18, 5.6% from 18 to 24, 25.8% from 25 to 44, 24.7% from 45 to 64, and 12.4% who were 65 years of age or older. The median age was 36 years. For every 100 females, there were 89.4 males. For every 100 females age 18 and over, there were 96.8 males.

The median income for a household in the city was $48,523, and the median income for a family was $49,659. Males had a median income of $31,875 versus $21,563 for females. The per capita income for the city was $19,184. About 4.3% of families and 7.1% of the population were below the poverty line, including 8.1% of those under the age of eighteen and 4.3% of those 65 or over.

References

Further reading

External links
 Manter - Directory of Public Officials
 USD 452, local school district
 Manter City Map, KDOT

Cities in Kansas
Cities in Stanton County, Kansas